Cycas edentata is a species of cycad with a widespread distribution across Southeast Asia. It originally referred only to a single population of Cycas from Calusa Island in Cagayancillo, Philippines.

References

edentata
Flora of Indo-China
Flora of Malesia
Taxa named by David John de Laubenfels